Malachai O'Hara, usually known as Mal O'Hara, is a Northern Irish politician who has been the Leader of the Green Party Northern Ireland since August 2022, and was Deputy Leader of the Green Party from 2019 to 2022. O’Hara has been a councillor on Belfast City Council since 2019.

Early life 
O'Hara was born in North Belfast. He attended St Malachy's College, and was classmates with John Finucane, who also later entered politics. Leaving school the same year the Good Friday Agreement was signed, he then attended the University of Central England in Birmingham. Before entering politics, O'Hara worked as a community worker in loyalist areas, delivered European Union peace funding programmes and managed health initiatives for the Rainbow Project, Ireland's biggest LGBT organisation. While working for the Rainbow Project he was vice-chair of the Equal Marriage Campaign, contributing to the legalisation of same-sex marriage in Northern Ireland.

O'Hara is the founder of Alternative Queer Ulster, an evening event that brings LGBTQ people into the Northern Ireland Assembly, a place often considered "a cold house to the LGBTQ community".

Political career 
O'Hara joined the Green Party in 2014. He was elected to Belfast City Council in 2019 for the Castle area, in an election where the Greens quadrupled their seats on the council, moving from 1 seat to 4. O'Hara became the first Green Party councillor to be elected in North Belfast. He is also one of the few openly LGBTQ+ elected members of the council.

On the council, O'Hara has been a prominent campaigner for clean air, rent controls and climate action. He has called for a citizens' assembly to examine if drugs should be legalised in Northern Ireland, citing increasing drug deaths as evidence that Northern Ireland's current approach is "obviously not working."

O'Hara was a candidate for the Green Party in the Belfast North constituency for the 2017 Northern Ireland Assembly Election where he received 711 first preference votes, a 1.7% share of the vote. He was a candidate in Belfast North in the 2022 Northern Ireland Assembly election receiving 1446 first preference votes thereby increasing his share of the vote to 3.1%. 

O'Hara became the leader of the Green Party Northern Ireland on 15 August 2022, following a leadership election in which he was the only candidate. He is the first openly gay leader of a major party in Northern Ireland.

Personal life
During the first wave of the COVID-19 pandemic, O'Hara led a group of over 70 volunteers who set up a cross community soup-kitchen to deliver over 17,000 meals to vulnerable people across North and West Belfast.

References 

1979 births
Living people
Green Party in Northern Ireland councillors
LGBT politicians from Northern Ireland
Members of Belfast City Council
People from Belfast
Leaders of political parties in Northern Ireland